Jhon Freduar Vásquez Anaya (born 12 February 1995) is a Colombian footballer who plays for Deportivo Cali.

Career

At the age of 15, Vásquez joined the youth academy of Colombian top flight side Atlético Junior.

For the 2017 season, he signed for Real Cartagena in the Colombian second division.

For the 2019 season, he signed for Colombian top flight club Alianza Petrolera.

References

External links
 

Colombian footballers
Living people
Association football wingers
Association football forwards
1995 births
People from Cartagena, Colombia
Colombian expatriate footballers
Expatriate footballers in Brazil
Colombian expatriate sportspeople in Brazil
Campeonato Brasileiro Série A players
Barranquilla F.C. footballers
Atlético Junior footballers
Alianza Petrolera F.C. players
Real Cartagena footballers
Cúcuta Deportivo footballers
Deportivo Cali footballers
Ceará Sporting Club players